Life in Color or Life in Colour may refer to:

 Life in Color, company known for concert tour series
 Life in Color (film), 2015
 "Life in Color", song by OneRepublic from the album Native
 Life in Colour (album), by Andreya Triana
 Life in Colour (EP), by Nina Nesbitt
 Life in Colour (miniseries), 2021 nature documentary miniseries presented by David Attenborough

See also 
 Color (disambiguation)